Christmas in Conway is a 2013 American Christmas romantic drama television film directed by John Kent Harrison, written by Stephen P. Lindsey and Luis Ugaz, and starring Andy Garcia, Mandy Moore, and Mary-Louise Parker. The film is part of the Hallmark Hall of Fame series, and premiered on ABC on December 1, 2013.

Plot
When terminally-ill Suzy Mayor leaves the hospital to spend her last days at her home in Conway, South Carolina, her grouch of a husband, Duncan, is beside himself with concern for her and with annoyance at everyone else, including Natalie, the live-in hospice nurse who has come home with Suzy. When Duncan decides to build a Ferris wheel in the backyard as a Christmas present for Suzy, in honor of the place where Duncan proposed to her, the neighbors and townspeople of this quiet Southern town are quick to object.

Cast 
 Andy Garcia as Duncan Mayor
 Mandy Moore as Natalie Springer
 Cheri Oteri as Gayle Matthews
 Riley Smith as Tommy Harris
 Mary-Louise Parker as Suzy Mayor
 Mark Jeffrey Miller as Henry

Production
The film was shot in and around Wilmington, North Carolina, in August 2013. Its score was composed by Geoff Zanelli.

Ratings
During its premiere broadcast on December 1, 2013, the episode received a 1.1 rating and a 3 share in the key 18- to 49-year-old adult demographic. It was viewed by 6.45 million total viewers.  The ratings were considered to be poor,  and they were lower than a comparable Hallmark broadcast the previous year.

Awards and nominations
The film was nominated for two MovieGuide Awards in 2014: the Faith and Freedom Award (Television), and the Free Enterprise Prize.  It did not win in either category.

References

External links
 
 Christmas In Conway Ferris Wheel

2013 television films
2013 films
2013 romantic drama films
2010s American films
2010s Christmas drama films
2010s English-language films
ABC network original films
American Christmas drama films
American drama television films
American romantic drama films
Christmas television films
Films about cancer
Films directed by John Kent Harrison
Films scored by Geoff Zanelli
Films set in South Carolina
Films shot in North Carolina
Hallmark Hall of Fame episodes
Romance television films